Yoyotte  is a surname. Notable people with the surname include:

Jean Yoyotte (1927–2009), French Egyptologist
Marie-Josèphe Yoyotte (1929–2017), French film and television editor and actress
Simone Yoyotte ( 1910–1933), Martinican poet and intellectual